Phorioppniidae is a family of bryozoans belonging to the order Cheilostomatida.

Genera:
 Oppiphorina Gordon & d'Hondt, 1997
 Phorioppnia Gordon & d'Hondt, 1997
 Punctiscutella Gordon & d'Hondt, 1997
 Quadriscutella Bock & Cook, 1993

References

Cheilostomatida